These organizations for higher (tertiary, postsecondary) education have a common purpose and mission for advocacy in numerous areas of both institutional management and the general public interest.  The organizations have specific purpose for issues from faculty unionization to public policy research and service to institutions.  Most are focused on the organization and governance of higher and tertiary education, but some are involved in service and research at all levels of education.

Annotated list of organizations

Organizations by category

Faculty union

American Association of University Professors
The American Association of University Professors (AAUP) states purpose “to define fundamental professional values and standards for higher education, and to ensure higher education's contribution to the common good” (AAUP, 2006).  Established in 1915, the organization began at a time when there were concerns over academic freedom.  Also an era of laissez-faire economics, there was increased need for labor unionizing.  University professors organized themselves to ensure their rights and freedoms in academic scholarship, ironically catalyst from a debate over economics.  While the organization is best known for the protection of academic freedom, the AAUP also promotes shared democratic governance for postsecondary education in the United States.

American Federation of Teachers

The American Federation of Teachers (AFT) was founded in 1916 to promote the professional interests of teachers, including their economic and social interests through affiliation with international unionization.  The organization hosts the Quality Education Standards in Teaching (QuEST) conference.  Their site includes numerous reports and publications, a legislative action center as well as other important information.

National Center for the Study of Collective Bargaining in Higher Education
The National Center for the Study of Collective Bargaining in Higher Education and the Professions (NCSCBHEP) was established in 1972.  The center is supported by the Hunter College at the City University of New York.  The NCSCBHEP is “an impartial and non-profit educational institution and serves as a clearinghouse forum for those engaged in the study and practice of collective bargaining” (NCSCBHEP, 2006).  The center's services include an annual conference, workshops and publications.  Publications from the NCSCBHEP include texts on the proceedings of the annual conference and commentary from the national executive, a directory of statistical analysis on collective bargaining, a bibliography of literature reviews, and monographs contributed by scholars.

National Education Association

The National Education Association (NEA) offers resources and tools for research in education.  The NEA Research Center provides detailed studies on issues related to governance in Higher Education.  The research includes a variety of topics from the changing trends in European Higher Education and its potential effects for Europe and the United States to information on Community College faculty.  The NEA also features a number of publications, including Update, The Almanac, Thought and Action, Advocate Online (each of which are available for visitors online), and several publications focused on academic justice and excellence.

Governance, leadership, and management

Association for Tertiary Education Management
The Association for Tertiary Education Management (ATEM) is an Australasian professional organization for managers and administrators in higher education.  The association provides services for professional development in tertiary management for all postsecondary institutions, from technical education to institutions of higher education.  Established in 1976, its constitution stated aims to raise the standards of professional qualifications for Education Administration, to provide a forum for dialogue, and to represent the interests of their members (ATEM 2007).  The organization provides thorough information on its history, constitution, and member benefits among a wide range of reference on the association and its core objectives.  ATEM offers a grant to members, hosts annual conferences, offers education and training programs, and publishes the Journal of Higher Education Policy and Management.  The organization has branch offices throughout Australia and New Zealand.  Retrieved March 23, 2007,  http://www.atem.org.au/index.cfm

Association of Community College Trustees
The Association of Community College Trustees (ACCT) notes that it is the only national association organized specifically to meet the needs of community college governing boards in the United States.  The organization represents more than 6,500 elected and appointed trustees who govern over 1,200 community, technical and junior colleges in the United States.  The organization hosts the annual National Community College Leadership Congress and the National Community College Legislative Summit delivered by experts on governance and public policy.  The association hosts governance leadership institutes and provides other board leadership services for community college trustees, as well as advocates for community colleges at the federal level in Washington, D.C.  ACCT's is the publisher of numerous books and booklets to promote effective community college governance, all of which are available for purchase online. Retrieved June 1, 2009,  http://www.acct.org/resources/publications/bookstore.php

Association of Governing Boards of Universities and Colleges
The Association of Governing Boards of Universities and Colleges (AGB) notes that it is the only national association organized to meet the needs of governing boards for higher education in the United States.  The organization serves the trustees and regents, professional staff members, senior level administrators and associated CEOs of university governing boards with purpose to “foster cooperation among all education stakeholders” (AGB, 2006).  The organization hosts conferences and workshops delivered by expert practitioners in higher education.  The association offers consulting and benchmarking services. The AGB is also the host of the Zwingle Library and Resource Center and the Richard T. Ingram Center for Public Trusteeship and Governance.  Their site features numerous publications available for purchase online. Retrieved December 3, 2006,  http://www.atlanta101.com/resources/national/agbuc.asp

The Leadership Foundation for Higher Education

The Leadership Foundation for Higher Education (LFHE) is an organization based in the United Kingdom for service and support to institutions in the area of leadership, governance and management.  The foundation was established and is supported by two other educational organizations in the United Kingdom, including Universities UK and GuildHE.  Their site offers a miscellany of information on postsecondary and tertiary education in the UK.  LFHE hosts forums and summits, conferences as well as numerous programs for professional and staff development, including summits and research to support international issues in higher education.  The foundation website provides numerous resources describing ongoing research projects.  The site is overall a valuable resource to explore important research topics for UK universities and an international context.  The organization offers news, publishes an annual report and other literatures related to their operations, and provides for additional resources and links for online visitors.  Retrieved March 23, 2007,  http://www.lfhe.ac.uk/

State Higher Education Executive Offices
Established in 1954, the mission of the State of Higher Education Executive Offices (SHEEO) is to assist in sustaining educational systems, emphasize state planning, promote financing interests, cooperation with state agencies, formulate recommendations for relationships between institutions, government and private organizations, and encourage studies, planning and coordination.  The office accomplishes these goals through service to statewide governing and coordinating boards.  The site offers news and resources with numerous links providing information on a number of issues in higher education and SHEEO projects.  A link for national data resources offers links to outside sources on national data, which is available to visitors online.  The level of the technical information available through these links is clearly beneficial to those pursuing research in the area. Retrieved December 3, 2006,  http://www.sheeo.org/

Legal

Campus Legal Information Clearinghouse
The Campus Legal Information Clearinghouse (CLIC) is a legal resource in cooperation between the American Council on Education (ACE) and The Catholic University of America's Office of General Counsel.  The website provides information and materials on legal compliance in higher education.  The organization states its mission “to build a freely available, web based collection of user-friendly compliance materials (such as Frequently Asked Questions, plain English explanations of the law, sample publications, videos and web tutorials from other institutions) to help all American college and university campuses enhance compliance with most major federal regulations applicable to higher education institutions” (CLIC, 2006).  The website notes that with a growing number of federal regulations in higher education, legal issues can become complicated, believing the information on the site is a step toward collaborative problem solving.  The site provides court case rulings on specific topics of interest, a calendar for legally required reports to meet federal legal compliance, and summary of laws governing higher education. Retrieved December 10, 2006,  http://counsel.cua.edu/

National Association of College and University Attorneys
The association was founded in the 1960s by a group of legal specialists that provided counsel to colleges and universities (the first group of attorneys of such kind in the United States). The website states its mission “to advance the effective practice of higher education attorneys for the benefit of the colleges and universities they serve” (NACUA, 2006). The site also states its core values as “committed to practicing and promoting the core values of quality, service, civility, collegiality, diversity, inclusiveness and respect” (NACUA, 2006). The NACUA offers news from its own bulletin, service for legal reference, educational programs (workshops, seminars and learning materials), and publications related to legal issues in higher education. The publications consist of pamphlets, brochures, a scholarly journal, and a number of academic books that are available for mail order and purchase online. Retrieved December 10, 2006,  http://www.nacua.org/

Policy research

Center for the Study of Higher Education
The Center for the Study of Higher Education is part of the College of Education at Penn State.  Established in 1969, the center claims to be one of the first research centers established for the study of public policy for higher education.  The center focuses on the four general areas:  teaching and learning, minority access and retention, faculty in higher education, organization and administration.  Their mission is to research a broad range of challenges to higher education, provide credibility through depth, collaboration to enrich research, and improve higher education policy and practice.  Retrieved December 3, 2006,  http://www.ed.psu.edu/cshe/index.html

Educational Policy Institute
The Educational Policy Institute is a non-profit, non-partisan research organization dedicated to the study of educational opportunity. Based in Virginia Beach, Virginia, EPI also has offices in Toronto, Canada, and Melbourne, Australia. EPI conducts policy analysis, program evaluation, and professional development in the K-12, postsecondary, and workforce areas. EPI's website provides free resources for professionals, and also sponsors www.studentretention.org, a web portal for those interested in student retention in higher education. EPI conducts several conferences and workshops in the US, Canada and abroad each year.  http://www.educationalpolicy.org/

Institute for Higher Education Policy
The Institute for Higher Education Policy (IHEP) is an independent, nonprofit organization that is dedicated to access and success in postsecondary education around the world. Established in 1993, the Washington, D.C.-based organization uses unique research and innovative programs to inform key decision makers who shape public policy and support economic and social
development. IHEP's Web site, www.ihep.org, features an expansive collection of higher education information available free of charge and provides access to some of the most respected professionals in the fields of public policy and research.  http://www.ihep.org/

The Center for Community College Policy
The Center for Community College Policy aims to meet the needs of state policymakers by conducting research, publishing and disseminating papers, organizing workshops, providing technical assistance and a web database.  The center emphasizes the importance of community colleges while noting the myriad of recent challenges to two-year institutions. Their site features publications that are available for visitors online and numerous outside links. Retrieved December 3, 2006,  http://www.communitycollegepolicy.org/default.asp

The National Center for Public Policy and Higher Education
The National Center for Public Policy and Higher Education is an independent, nonpartisan and nonprofit organization with aims to promote public policies “that enhance Americans' opportunities to pursue and achieve high-quality education and training beyond high school” (NCPPHE, 2006).  Established in 1998, the center is a resource for policy development and as a catalyst for improving public policy in both K-Twelve and postsecondary education.  In addition to conducting independent research, the national center produces performance results to communicate to key leaders and the general public its mission to be a catalyst to improving policy. The site offers news, reports, and a link for its publication Cross Talk (which is available to the site visitors online).  The site also offers a link to numerous other sites related to education. Retrieved December 3, 2006,  http://www.highereducation.org/

Policy Center on the First Year of College
The policy center states its mission for “the improvement of the beginning college experience through enhanced learning, success, and retention of new students” (Policy Center, 2006). The center maintains that the first year of postsecondary learning is foundational for student success in higher education. The site offers a number of links on policy initiatives. The Foundations of Excellence project is the “signature” project of the policy center, which is a guided self-study strategy for improving and enhancing the student's first year of study. The center features surveys and publications available online to visitors. Their site is a valuable for finding data and research in the area. Retrieved December 3, 2006,  http://www.firstyear.org/

The Pullias Center for Higher Education
The Pullias Center for Higher Education is located at the University of Southern California Rossier School of Education.  The center brings “a multidisciplinary perspective to complex social, political, and economic issues in higher education” (Pullias, 2012).  Research at the center is characterized as theory informed with “real-world applicability.”  The center is focused on improving urban higher education, strengthening partnerships with schools, and understanding international education.  A link for cultural literacy offers information on outside journals and publications.  Research is available to visitors at the website with links to books written by center members available at Amazon.com.  Retrieved June 21, 2017,  http://pullias.usc.edu

Research (general)

Higher Education Research Institute
The Higher Education Research Institute is an organization at the University of California-based within the Graduate School of Education and Information Studies.  The institute serves as a center for interdisciplinary research in postsecondary education.  Research and publications are available online and for purchase.  The institute does provide detailed summaries of the research that is available for purchase.  The site also features news and press releases for research underway and completed. Retrieved December 3, 2006,  http://www.gseis.ucla.edu/heri/KFHET_monographs.html

National Center of Education Statistics
Through the U.S. Department of Education, the National Center of Education Statistics (NCES) provides statistics for both K-Twelve and Higher Education.  The site offers no information on its history, mission, etc.  The site includes links to all sorts of information with data tools, surveys and research, search options, fast facts on education as well as a site for kids.  Generally, the data available through does not offer detail on method.  Numerous publications are available to visitors online.  The site basically offers “consumer-oriented” information and data for researchers. Retrieved December 3, 2006,  http://nces.ed.gov/

Service/Advocacy

Education Commission of the States
Created in 1965, the Education Commission of the States is an interstate organization for information exchange to improve public education.  The website offers a wide range of resources from publications to general news, projects and institutes.  The organization has collaborated with the National Center for Public Policy and Higher Education and the National Center for Higher Education Management systems to create the National Collaborative for Postsecondary Education Policy.  The collaborative focuses on meeting the needs of the students of home states.  Findings from the collaboration emphasize state leadership and citizen groups to inform public opinion. Retrieved December 3, 2006,  http://www.ecs.org/

Western Interstate Commission for Higher Education
The Western Interstate Commission for Higher Education (WICHE) was created in 1951 and is an interstate organization that promote collaboration between state governments and also provides data and policy analysis for educators, policymakers and governors of 15 states in the Western part of the United States.

Higher Learning Commission
The Higher Learning Commission (HLC) is part of the North Central Association of Colleges and Schools (NCA).  The NCA itself accredits schools throughout the central region of the United States. The Mission Statement of the HLC is simply stated to:  “Serving the common good by assuring and advancing the quality of higher learning” (HLC, 2006). The commission offers opportunities for education and training, has an annual meeting, links information on accrediting agencies. Links to current projects include projects for assessment, first year initiative programs, public information and a doctoral task force project.

The United Nations Educational, Scientific, and Cultural Organization
The United Nations division for education, science and culture (UNESCO) provides information on reforming higher education, believing that higher and tertiary education internationally will confront “formidable challenges and must proceed to the most radical change and renewal” (UNESCO 2007).  The organization states its mission and strategy to strengthen the national capacities for improving higher education, providing global leadership and teacher training, developing policy to respond to the challenges of globalization through knowledge sharing, and assisting member states for sustainable development.  UNESCO thus provides various resources on higher education, including links to conference information, news, publications available online, and student tools.  Their communities for action represent their major initiatives in higher education, which includes global forums for research and knowledge sharing , quality assurance and accreditation , collective consultation in higher education , higher education for all , their programs for university networking  and sustainable development .  Retrieved March 23, 2007,  http://portal.unesco.org/education/en/ev.php-URL_ID=40215&URL_DO=DO_TOPIC&URL_SECTION=201.html

See also 
 Educational research
 Governance in higher education
 Higher education

References

Educational organizations based in the United States